The 53rd NAACP Image Awards, presented by the NAACP, honored outstanding representations and achievements of people of color in motion pictures, television, music, and literature during the 2021 calendar year. The ceremony aired on February 26, 2022, on BET and simulcast on several of its sister Paramount Global Networks. The ceremony was hosted for the ninth time by actor Anthony Anderson. Presentations of untelevised categories were livestreamed on January 18, 2022, on the ceremony's website.

The nominations were announced on January 18, 2022, with the film The Harder They Fall and the comedy series Insecure leading the nominations with twelve each. In the recording categories, H.E.R. received the most nominations with six, followed by Chlöe, Drake, Silk Sonic and Jazmine Sullivan with four each. For the first time in the history of the awards ceremony, it have been included five categories to reward podcasts and social media influencer.

American journalist Nikole Hannah-Jones was honored with the Social Justice Impact Award at the ceremony for her "social efforts in reporting for The New York Times Magazine about the police injustices and crimes against black people in the United States". American actor and producer Samuel L. Jackson was also honored with the Chairman's Award, for his "social activism in the 1960s, even serving as an usher at Martin Martin Luther King Jr.’s funeral. His continued public service and advocacy for social change".

For the first time since 1993 ceremony, members of the Mexican American Legislative Caucus, Texas House Democratic Caucus and Texas Legislative Black Caucus were recognized with the Roy Wilkins Civil Rights Award to "exemplify the spirit of the NAACP".

The ceremony honored the President of the Connecticut State Conference of NAACP Branches, Scot X. Esdaile, with the first ever Activist of the Year Award. NAACP Youth-Council founder Chinning Hill was recognized with the first ever Youth Activist of the Year Award.

All nominees are listed below, and the winners are listed in bold.

Special Awards

Motion Picture

Television and Streaming

Drama

Comedy

Television Movie, Limited-Series or Dramatic Special

Overall Acting

Reality and Variety

Other categories

Recording

Podcast and social media

Literary

References

External links 

 NAACP Image Awards official site

NAACP Image Awards
NAACP
NAACP
NAACP
NAACP
NAACP